Linophryne algibarbata is a leftvent sea devil in the genus Linophryne that lives in waters between  in the North Atlantic Ocean.

References

Linophrynidae
Deep sea fish
Fish described in 1939